Thomas Edward Simpson (August 10, 1873 – July 16, 1951) was a Canadian politician.

Born in Dufferin County, Ontario, Simpson represented the electoral district of Algoma West in the House of Commons of Canada from 1917 to 1935. He was a member of Robert Borden's Unionist Party caucus from 1917 to 1921, and of the Conservative Party caucus after 1921.

He served as Chief Government Whip from 1930 until his retirement from politics in 1935.

References
 

1873 births
1951 deaths
Unionist Party (Canada) MPs
Conservative Party of Canada (1867–1942) MPs
Members of the House of Commons of Canada from Ontario